Twice Round the Daffodils is a 1962 British comedy film directed by Gerald Thomas and starring Juliet Mills, Donald Sinden, Donald Houston, Kenneth Williams, Ronald Lewis, Andrew Ray, Joan Sims and Jill Ireland. The film was adapted from the play Ring for Catty by Patrick Cargill and Jack Beale. Carry On Nurse from 1959 was based on the same play.

The cast and production team of Twice Round the Daffodils create a noticeable similarity with the Carry On films, but the film is not an official member of the Carry On series.

The film was shot at Pinewood Studios using Heatherden Hall as the sanatorium.

Plot
A new group of patients arrives at a hospital to be treated for tuberculosis; more than one takes a fancy to one or other of the attractive nurses.

The patients include John, a Welsh coal miner in a state of denial about his disease; Ian, a woman-chasing RAF officer; Bob, a man losing his girlfriend due to his lengthy stay in hospital; Henry, a supercilious bachelor with a devoted, letter-writing sister; George, a West Country farmer with hidden intelligence; and the young Chris, a timid and sensitive trainee chef who writes poetry and is bullied by John about his masculinity.

Cast
 Juliet Mills as Nurse Catty
 Donald Sinden as Ian Richards
 Donald Houston as John Rhodes
 Kenneth Williams as Henry Halfpenny
 Ronald Lewis as Bob White
 Andrew Ray as Chris Walker
 Amanda Reiss as Nurse Beamish
 Renee Houston as Matron
 Joan Sims as Harriet Halfpenny
 Mary Powell as Mrs Rhodes
 Jill Ireland as Janet
 Lance Percival as George Logg
 Sheila Hancock as Dora
 Nanette Newman as Joyce

References

External links

1962 films
British comedy-drama films
1962 comedy-drama films
1960s English-language films
Films directed by Gerald Thomas
Films set in hospitals
Films shot at Pinewood Studios
Films produced by Peter Rogers
Films with screenplays by Norman Hudis
Films about tuberculosis
1960s British films